Dolichognatha deelemanae is a species of spider in the family Tetragnathidae, found in Borneo.

References

Tetragnathidae
Spiders described in 2008
Spiders of Asia